{{Speciesbox
| image = Acipenser sturio 1879.jpg
| image_caption = Acipenser sturio
| name = European sturgeon
| status = CR
| status_system = IUCN3.1
| status_ref = 
| status2 = CITES_A1 
 | status2_system = CITES 
 | status2_ref = 
| taxon = Acipenser sturio
| authority = Linnaeus, 1758
| synonyms_ref=
| synonyms = {{collapsible list|bullets = true|title=List
| Acipenser attilus Rafinesque 1820 corrig. Gray 1851
| Acipenser latirostris Parnell 1831-37
| Acipenser hospitus Krøyer 1852
| Acipenser thompsonii Ball 1856
| Acipenser sturioides Malm 1861
| Acipenser yarrellii Duméril 1867
| Acipenser (Huso) milberti Duméril 1870
| Acipenser (Huso) fitzingerii Valenciennes ex Duméril 1870
| Acipenser (Huso) ducissae Duméril 1870
| Acipenser (Huso) nehelae Duméril 1870
| Acipenser (Huso) podapos Duméril 1870
| Acipenser (Huso) valenciennii Duméril 1870
| Acipenser laevissimus <small>Valenciennes ex Duméril 1870
| Acipenser europaeus Brusina 1902
| Acipenser shipus Güldenstädt 1772 non Lovetzky 1834
| Antacea shipa (Güldenstadt 1772)
| Antaceus shipus (Güldenstadt 1772)
| Shipa shipa (Güldenstädt 1772)
| Sturio vulgaris Rafinesque 1810
| Acipenser vulgaris (Rafinesque 1810) Billberg 1833
| Acipenser atlanticus Rafinesque 1820 corrig.
}}
}}

The European sea sturgeon (Acipenser sturio), also known as the Atlantic sturgeon or common sturgeon, is a species of sturgeon native to Europe. It was formerly abundant, being found in coastal habitats all over Europe. It is anadromous and breeds in rivers.  It is currently a critically endangered species. Although the name Baltic sturgeon sometimes has been used, it has now been established that sturgeon of the Baltic region are A. oxyrinchus'', a species otherwise restricted to the Atlantic coast of North America.

Description

The wedge-shaped head of the European sea sturgeon ends in a long point.  There are many sensitive barbels on the facial area.  The dorsal fins are located very far back on the body. Five longitudinal lines of large osseous plates are found on the body of the fish.  The stomach is yellow and the back is a brownish grey.

Distribution and habitat
They are found on the coasts of Europe, except in the northernmost regions and the Baltic region, and have rarely even been known to cross the Atlantic Ocean to the coasts of North America. Like many other sturgeons, they spawn in the rivers inland from the coast. The species can tolerate wide spread salinities and spend most of their lives in saltwater but migrate to spawn in freshwater.

Conservation
At the beginning of the 19th century, these fish were used extensively to produce caviar, but have been a protected species in Europe since 1982. Despite their estimated range of distribution, they have become so rare that they only breed in the Garonne river basin in France. Conservation projects involving this species include reintroductions based on specimens from aquaculture with the first releases in 1995. For example, 87 sturgeons were experimentally released in the Rhine near Nijmegen in 2012 and 2015.

Diet
Like other sturgeons, they eat polychaete worms and crustaceans which they find with their barbels.

Threats 
Historical habitat changes to the European sturgeon, such as gravel extraction from riverbeds and damming of the Dordogne and Garonne Rivers, have resulted in a reduction in the number of available spawning sites, contributing to the species' low abundance and regional dispersion. Furthermore, despite recent gains in compliance with fisheries bans, bycatch in commercial benthic trawls and gillnet fisheries threatens reintroduction attempts and is regarded the biggest threat to the remaining population and a major impediment to the species' recovery.

Population 
Although no specific population estimates are available, the abundance of wild, mature European Sturgeon is estimated to be less than 800 individuals. The last time the species hatched was in the Garonne River in France in 1994, and genetic analysis reveals that the 1994 cohort was formed by only one mating pair. Because the wild population is so small, a captive breeding and stocking program is vital to the species' survival. Although restoration operations, such as artificially bred individual restocking, have been successful in the Gironde estuary and the Elbe River (Germany), recovery for the European sturgeon is a long process that might take 30-50 years. Bycatch in commercial trawls and gillnets, pollution, climate change, and potential competition with other species are all dangers to the species right now.

Scientific Classification

References

External links
ARKive - images and movies of the European sea sturgeon(Acipenser sturio)

European sea sturgeon
Fish of the Atlantic Ocean
Fish of the North Sea
Freshwater fish of Europe
Marine fish of Europe
Critically endangered fish
Critically endangered biota of Europe
European sea sturgeon
Taxa named by Carl Linnaeus